Jean-Luc Thérier (7 October 1945, Hodeng-au-Bosc – 31 July 2019, Neufchâtel-en-Bray) was a French rally driver. He was the highest scoring driver in the inaugural World Rally Championship in 1973 and the only one to win three events. However, until 1977 the championship was only formally contested by manufacturers, not individuals, so only Thérier's Alpine-Renault team were formally awarded the title.

He most frequently competed in an Alpine Renault A110, winning the Rallye Sanremo and the Acropolis Rally in 1970. He won the same two events again in 1973, along with the 1973 Rallye de Portugal, during his annus memorabilis.

He also won the 1974 Press-on-Regardless Rally in the United States driving a Renault 17 Gordini, and the 1980 Tour de Corse behind the wheel of a Porsche 911 SC.

He participated in the Monte Carlo Rally 13 times between 1969 and 1984, with second place in 1971 as best result there.  His career lasted until early 1985 when he suffered severe injuries while participating in the 1985 Paris to Dakar rally. He died on 31 July 2019 at the age of 73 after a long illness.

WRC victories
{|class="wikitable"
!   #  
! Event
! Season
! Co-driver
! Car
|-
| 1
|  7º TAP Rallye de Portugal
| 
| Jacques Jaubert
| Alpine-Renault A110 1800
|-
| 2
|  21st Acropolis Rally
| 
| Christian Delferrier
| Alpine-Renault A110 1800
|-
| 3
|  15º Rallye Sanremo
| 
| Jacques Jaubert
| Alpine-Renault A110 1800
|-
| 4
|  26th Press-on-Regardless Rally
| 
| Christian Delferrier
| Renault 17 Gordini
|-
| 5
|  24ème Tour de Corse - Rallye de France
| 
| Michel Vial
| Porsche 911 SC
|}

Complete IMC results

References

External links
Profile of Thérier, Rallybase.nl

1945 births
2019 deaths
French rally drivers
World Rally Championship drivers
24 Hours of Le Mans drivers
World Sportscar Championship drivers